The D'Una River is a river of the state of Santa Catarina, Brasil.

Course
The D'Una rises in the  Serra do Tabuleiro State Park.
The lush forests of the park protect the sources of the Vargem do Braço, Cubatão and D'Una rivers, which supply most of the drinking water for greater Florianópolis and the south coast region.
The river runs south into the Lagoa do Imaruí, which empties into the Atlantic Ocean beside Laguna, Santa Catarina.

See also
List of rivers of Santa Catarina
List of rivers of Brazil

References

Sources

Rivers of Santa Catarina (state)